The Fountain, also known as Walnut Fountain and the Colonel Davenport House, is a historic plantation home located at Yadkin Valley, Caldwell County, North Carolina.  It was built in 1807, and is a two-story, "T"-shaped frame dwelling with Federal and Greek Revival style design elements. Also on the property is a contributing brick well house/dairy (c. 1865–1870).

It was listed on the National Register of Historic Places in 2004.

References

External links

Historic American Buildings Survey in North Carolina
Houses on the National Register of Historic Places in North Carolina
Federal architecture in North Carolina
Greek Revival houses in North Carolina
Houses completed in 1807
Houses in Caldwell County, North Carolina
National Register of Historic Places in Caldwell County, North Carolina